Scion, a company officially registered as New Zealand Forest Research Institute Limited, is a New Zealand Crown Research Institute (CRI). Scion specialises in research, science and technology development for the forestry, wood product, wood-derived materials, and other biomaterial sectors.

Scion is the lead CRI in 
 Sustainable forest management and tree improvement. 
 Forestry biosecurity, risk management and mitigation.
 Wood processing, wood-related bioenergy, waste streams and other biomaterials. 
 Forestry and forestry-based ecosystem services to inform land-use decision making.

Scion collaborates with other research providers and end-users to develop: 
 Land-based biosecurity, soil and freshwater management. 
 Climate change adaptation and mitigation.
 Indigenous forestry. 
 Industrial biotechnology and high-value manufacturing.

Scion makes its plant collection data available online as part of the Australasian Virtual Herbarium.

The name “scion” refers to a cutting or shoot used to form a graft.2

It is wholly owned by the New Zealand government and constituted as a limited liability company under the New Zealand Companies Act 1993.

Main research areas 
Staff undertake work in the fields of  
 Entomology 
 Plant pathology 
 Plant genetics 
 Silviculture
 Microbiology 
 Dendrology 
 Botany 
 Plant physiology 
 Biochemistry
 Soil science  
 Systems ecology 
 Earth science 
 Environmental and resource economics 
 Timber, chemical and mechanical engineering
 Bioinformatics  
 Geospatial analysis  
 Wood mycology  
 Biotechnology

Purpose  

Scion's purpose is to drive innovation and growth from these sectors to build economic value and contribute to beneficial environmental and social outcomes for New Zealand.3 This is achieved through providing research, technology and knowledge in partnership with industry, government and Māori stakeholders, working in the following areas:

Commercial forestry 

Scion is working to maximise the value and productivity of New Zealand's commercial forests, by: 
 increasing wood quality and volume growth through a combination of genetic tree improvement and forest management 
 reducing the cost of harvesting trees 
 expanding the range of tree species that contribute to commercial forestry 
 enabling forest owners to maximise value from carbon forestry.

Wood products and processing 

The competitiveness of the solid wood processing industry is improved by Scion's work to: 
 develop wood segregation technologies that improve productivity and reduce costs 
 encourage and enabling increased use of wood in construction 
 develop new product opportunities through wood modification technologies.

Wood fibre, pulp, biopolymer and biochemical industries 

Scion is expanding New Zealand's opportunities for using wood fibres, biopolymers and biochemical by developing: 
 new product opportunities for the pulp and paper sector through biorefinery technologies 
 new composite products for manufacturers 
 renewable chemicals from forest biomass 
 new packaging products for food exporters.

Risk and adaptation 

New Zealand's ability to manage risks associated with biosecurity, fire and climate change has been improved by Scion's work with government agencies, forest growers and science collaborators nationally and internationally to: 
 reduce the impacts of established pests and diseases 
 assist fire management agencies with protecting New Zealand's rural landscape 
 underpin effective biosecurity systems for New Zealand.

Licence to operate 

Through targeted research aimed at enhancing environmental performance, Scion protects the New Zealand forest industry's licence to operate domestically and internationally by: 
 assisting the forest and wood processing sectors to reduce their environmental footprint 
 developing tools that support land use management and optimise the multiple benefits of forestry in the landscape 
 providing technical information to support increased utilisation of wood.

Bioenergy 

Scion: 
 develops technologies for producing heat, power and liquid fuels from woody biomass 
 supports the development of a supply chain for woody biomass targeted at energy production.

Databases and National Collections 

Scion is home to databases and collections of national and international importance.

They are widely used to support diagnostic services, research, and the development of industry standards.

National Forest Culture Collection

This is an internationally registered living collection of almost 3000 fungal specimens (including some bacteria and lichens) stored in culture. Some pathogenic (disease causing) fungi from overseas are stored in a containment facility.

National Forest Mycological Herbarium

This internationally registered collection comprises almost 2000 dried fungal specimens and plant material containing fungi. The earliest collections date back to the late 1800s from Sweden.

National Forestry Herbarium and Database

The herbarium contains plants significant to plantation and indigenous forestry in New Zealand, including a wide range of native and amenity species. 

National Forestry Library

Publications and media relating to forestry and wood processing research over the last 75 years are held in the National Forestry Library at Scion. The library contains one of the largest collections of forestry, forest products, biomaterials, and pulp and paper literature in the Southern Hemisphere.

Wood collection

An extensive xylarium – a collection of wood samples consisting thousands of species from all over the world - is cared for at Scion. This collection can be used to compare samples with unknown timbers.

Permanent Sample Plots database 

Scion's Permanent Sample Plot (PSP) system is a comprehensive database of forest growth data that underpins New Zealand's commercial forest industry. The system contains information about the effect factors such as environment, genetics and silviculture regimes have on the growth of stands and trees.

The PSP system holds data from the 1920s, and has been in a digital format since the early 1960s. The digital platform is a flexible relational database that holds different types of forest data for both experimental research and commercial growth plots. These data are sourced from permanent sample plots that have been established, and regularly measured, in different forest types throughout New Zealand. In 2017, the system holds data from 32,000 PSPs of which 11,500 are current and 20,500 historic records. The PSP system is one of the most extensive data resources on tree growth, internationally.4

Scientists and forest companies use this information to understand how current forests are performing, and how future forests might grow under different conditions. These data support important forest management decisions.

Scion Nursery  
The 10 hectare nursery in Rotorua has shade houses, controlled climate propagation facilities, commercial bare-root operations and a large purpose-built container-growing operation. The facility can on-grow 700,000 seedlings a year and is used for both research and commercial sales.

The work includes: 
 supporting advanced tree breeding programmes for radiata pine and other commercial forest species
 developing and using innovative propagation technologies 
 mass-producing genetically improved tree stocks for forest growers 
 transferring expertise from tissue culture to the nursery and into the forest.

History 
Scion is the trading name for New Zealand Forest Research Institute Limited. The head office and main campus is in Rotorua on a site that was once the headquarters for a forest nursery for a large government afforestation programme. The nursery was established in 1898 at the edge of Whakarewarewa Forest where more than 60 exotic species were planted on 5000 hectares to determine which species grew best in New Zealand conditions.

Research commenced on the campus in 1947 as a government-owned Forest Experiment Station. In 1949 it was renamed the Forest Research Institute (FRI) under the auspices of the New Zealand Forest Service.

In 1992 it was established as one of New Zealand's Crown Research Institutes (CRI) as part of the government of the day's science restructuring.

In 2005 the trading name Scion was adopted.

Locations 

Scion employs approximately 300 full-time equivalent staff, with its principal campus the main part of the Te Papa Tipu Innovation Park in Rotorua. It also has an office in Christchurch with close to 30 staff, as well as smaller offices in Wellington and Dunedin.

References

Crown Research Institutes of New Zealand
Forest research institutes
Forestry in New Zealand